Map of places in East Lothian compiled from this list

The List of places in East Lothian is a list for any town, village, hamlet, castle, golf course, historic house, hill fort, lighthouse, nature reserve, reservoir, river, and other place of interest in the East Lothian council area of Scotland.

A
Aberlady, Aberlady Bay 
Archerfield Estate and Links
Athelstaneford
Auldhame & Scoughall

B
Ballencrieff, Ballencrieff Castle 
Bankton House                                    
Bara
Barnes Castle
Barns Ness, Barns Ness Lighthouse
Bass Rock
Battle of Carberry Hill
Belhaven, Belhaven Brewery, Belhaven Sands
Biel, Biel House, Biel Water, 
Bilsdean
Birns Water
Birsley Brae
Black Castle
Blackcastle Hill
Blindwells
Bolton, Bolton Parish Church
Broxburn
Broxmouth
Brunton Theatre
Burns' Mother's Well

C
Canty Bay
Carberry, Carberry Tower
Castleton
Chesters Hill Fort
Cockenzie, Cockenzie Power Station
Cottyburn
Craigielaw Golf Course
Craigleith
Crossgatehall

D
Danskine
Dirleton, Dirleton Castle, Dirleton Kirk
Dolphinstone Castle 
Donolly Reservoir
Doonhill Homestead
Drem
Drummore House
Dunbar, Battle of Dunbar (1296), Battle of Dunbar (1650), Dunbar Collegiate Church, Dunbar Priory
Dunglass, Dunglass Collegiate Church, Dunglass Viaduct

E
East Fenton 
East Fortune
East Links Family Park
East Linton
East Saltoun
Elphinstone, Elphinstone Tower
Elvingston
Eskmills
Eyebroughy

F
Fa'side Castle
Fenton Barns, Fenton Tower
Fidra
Fisherrow
Flag Heritage Centre
Fountainhall

G
Gamelshiel Castle 
Garleton, Garleton Castle, Garleton Hills, Garleton Monument 
Garvald
Gifford
Gilchriston
Gladsmuir
Glenkinchie distillery
Gosford Bay, Gosford Estate, Gosford House, Gosford Sands
Gullane, Gullane Bents, Gullane railway station

H
Haddington, Haddington Line
Hailes Castle
Halls
Hamilton House
Heritage of Golf Museum
Hopetoun Monument
Humbie, Humbie Parish Church, Humbie Water
Hume Castle

I
Innerwick, Innerwick Castle
Inveresk, Inveresk Lodge Garden

J
John Muir Country Park, John Muir Way, John Muir's Birthplace
Johnscleugh

K
Keith Marischal
Kilspindie, Kilspindie Castle                                                                 
Kingston

L
Lamb
Lammermuir Hills
Lamp of Lothian Collegiate Centre 
Lennoxlove House
Levenhall Links
Lewisvale Park
Lochend Wood
Long Newton
Longniddry, Longniddry Bents, Longniddry railway station
Longyester
Luffness, Luffness Castle, Luffness Friary
Luggate, Luggateburn

M
Macmerry
Markle
Meadowmill
Morham
Morrison's Haven
Muirfield Golf Course
Musselburgh, Musselburgh Links, Musselburgh Racecourse, Musselburgh railway station
Myreton Motor Museum

N
National Museum of Flight
New Hailes
New Winton
Newbyth, Newbyth House
North Berwick, North Berwick Golf Club, North Berwick Harbour, North Berwick Law, North Berwick Line, North Berwick Museum, North Berwick Priory, North Berwick West Links
Northfield House 
Nunraw Abbey

O
Oldhamstocks
Ormiston

P
Papana Water
Papple
Peaston
Peffer Burn
Pencaitland
Pencraig Brae
Phantassie, Phantassie Doocot
Pinkie House
Pitcox
Poldrate Mill
Port Seton
Pressmennan Lake
Preston, Preston Mill
Preston, Preston House, Preston Tower
Prestongrange, Prestongrange Colliery, Prestongrange House, Prestongrange Industrial Heritage Museum, Prestongrange Parish Church
Prestonkirk House, Prestonkirk Parish Church
Prestonpans, Battle of Prestonpans, Prestonpans Tapestry

Q
Queen Margaret University

R
Ravensheugh Sands
Redhouse Castle
River Esk
River Tyne
Royal Musselburgh Golf Club

S
Saltcoats Castle
Saltoun Hall, Saltoun Big Wood, Saltoun Parish Church
Samuelston
Sancta Maria Abbey 
Scottish Seabird Centre
Scoughall
Seacliff
Seton Collegiate Church, Seton Sands, Seton House
Skateraw
Skid Hill
Smeaton, Smeaton Lake
Spittal
Spott
St. Baldred's Cradle
St. Mary's Priory
Stenton
Stoneypath Tower

T
Tantallon Castle
Thornton Castle
Thorntonloch
Thurston Manor
Torness nuclear power station
Tranent, Tranent Parish Church, Tranent to Cockenzie Waggonway
Traprain Law
Tyne Mouth
Tyninghame

W
Wallyford
Waterston House
Waughton Castle
West Barns
West Fenton
West Pans
West Saltoun
Whiteadder Water, Whiteadder Reservoir
White Castle
Whitecraig
Whitekirk
Whittingehame, Whittinghame House, Whittinghame Water
Winton House

Y
Yellowcraigs
Yester Castle, Yester Chapel, Yester Parish Church

See also
List of places in Scotland
List of places in Edinburgh
List of places in Midlothian
List of places in the Scottish Borders

External links
Place-names and the Scots language: the marches of lexical and onomastic research, by Maggie Scott
RCAHMS record for East Lothian
Gazetteer for East Lothian

East Lothian
Geography of East Lothian
Lists of places in Scotland
Populated places in Scotland